The German keyboard layout is a QWERTZ keyboard layout commonly used in Austria and Germany. It is based on one defined in a former edition (October 1988) of the German standard DIN 2137-2. The current edition DIN 2137-1:2012-06 standardizes it as the first (basic) one of three layouts, calling it "T1" ("keyboard layout 1").

The German layout differs from the English (US and UK) layouts in four major ways:
 The positions of the "Z" and "Y" keys are switched. In English, the letter "y" is very common and the letter "z" is relatively rare, whereas in German the letter "z" is very common and the letter "y" is very uncommon. The German layout places "z" in a position where it can be struck by the index finger, rather than by the weaker little finger.
 Part of the keyboard is adapted to include umlauted vowels (ä, ö, ü) and the sharp s (ß). (Some newer types of German keyboards offer the fixed assignment  → ẞ for its capitalized version.)
 Some of special key inscriptions are changed to a graphical symbol (e.g.  is an upward arrow,  a leftward arrow). Most of the other abbreviations are replaced by German abbreviations (thus e.g. "Ctrl" is translated to its German equivalent "Strg", for ). "Esc" remains as such. (See: "Key labels" below)
 Like many other non-American keyboards, German keyboards change the right Alt key into an Alt Gr key to access a third level of key assignments. This is necessary because the umlauts and some other special characters leave no room to have all the special symbols of ASCII, needed by programmers among others, available on the first or second (shifted) levels without unduly increasing the size of the keyboard.

General information 

The characters ², ³, {, [, ], }, \, @, |, µ, ~, and € are accessed by holding the  key and tapping the other key. The  key on the left will not access these additional characters. Alternatively  and pressing the respective key also produce the alternative characters in many environments, in order to support keyboards that only have one left  key.

If the entered combination is not encoded in Unicode by a single code point (precomposed character), most current implementations cause the display of a free-standing (spacing) version of the accent followed by the unaccented base letter. For users with insufficient typing skills this behaviour (which is explicitly not compliant with the current DIN 2137-1:2012-06) leads to mistype a spacing accent instead of an apostrophe (e.g., it´s  instead of correctly it's).

Note that the semicolon and colon are accessed by using the  key.

The "T1" layout lacks some important characters like the German-style quotation marks ( and ).

The "T2" layout newly defined in DIN 2137-1:2012-06 was designed to overcome such restrictions, but firstly to enable typing of other languages written in the Latin script. Therefore, it contains several additional diacritical marks and punctuation characters, including the full set of German, English, and French-style quotation marks in addition to the typographic apostrophe, the prime, the double prime, and the okina.

The image shows characters to be entered using  in the lower left corner of each key depiction (characters not contained in the "T1" layout are marked red). Diacritical marks are marked by a flat rectangle which also indicates the position of the diacritical mark relative to the base letter.

The characters shown at the right border of a keytop are accessed by first pressing a dead key sequence of AltGr plus the × multiplication sign.  This X-like symbol may be thought of as an "extra" dead key or "extra" accent type, used to access "miscellaneous" letters that do not have a specific accent type like diaeresis or circumflex.  Symbols on the right border shown in green have both upper-case and lower-case forms; the corresponding capital letter is available by pressing the Shift key simultaneously with the symbol key.  For instance, to type the lower-case æ ligature, hold the AltGr key and type ×, then release both keys and type the (unshifted) A key.  To type the upper-case Æ ligature, hold the AltGr key and type ×, then release both keys, hold Shift and type the (shifted) A key.  An active Caps Lock can be used instead of the Shift key to obtain the Æ ligature and similar letters.

In addition, DIN 2137-1:2012-06 defines a layout "T3", which is a superset of "T2" incorporating the whole "secondary group" as defined in ISO/IEC 9995-3:2010. Thus, it enables to write several minority languages (e.g. Sami) and transliterations, but is more difficult to comprehend than the "T2" layout, and therefore not expected to be accepted by a broad audience beyond experts who need this functionality.

Key labels 

Contrary to many other languages, German keyboards are usually not labeled in English (in fact, DIN 2137-1:2012-06 requires either the symbol according to ISO/IEC 9995-7 or the German abbreviation is to be used, with "Esc" as an exception). The abbreviations used on German keyboards are:

On some keyboards – including the original IBM PC/AT (and later) German keyboards – the asterisk (*) key on the numeric keypad is instead labeled with the multiplication sign (×), and the divide-key is labeled with the division sign (÷) instead of slash (/). However, those keys still generate the asterisk and slash characters, not the multiplication and division signs.

Caps lock 

The behaviour of  according to former editions of the DIN 2137 standard is inherited from mechanical typewriters: Pressing it once shifts all keys including numbers and special characters until the  key is pressed again. Holding  while  is active unshifts all keys. Both  and  lack any textual labels. The current DIN 2137-1:2012-06 simply requests the presence of a "capitals lock" key (which is the name used in the ISO/IEC 9995 series), without any description of its function.

OS-specific layouts

Linux 

Most Linux distributions include a keymap for German in Germany that extends the T1 layout with a set of characters and dead keys similar, but not identical to the "Outdated common secondary group" of ISO/IEC 9995-3:2002.

History

See also 
 ISO/IEC 9995

Notes and references 

Latin-script keyboard layouts

de:Tastaturbelegung